In the U.S. state of New York, District Courts are state courts that are a type of trial court of inferior jurisdiction.  District Courts are established in Nassau County the five western towns in Suffolk County.  Each contains individual districts for civil cases which are organized along town lines, while criminal cases are heard in a separate countywide (in Nassau) or half-countywide (in Suffolk) district.  They effectively replace town justice courts in these localities, but have subject-matter jurisdiction and operations similar to city courts.

They are not to be confused with the United States District Court for the Eastern District of New York, a federal court whose territorial jurisdiction includes the two Long Island counties as well as the city counties of Kings, Queens, and Richmond, or any of the other federal district courts in New York.

Subject-matter jurisdiction
The court has subject-matter jurisdiction over civil matters seeking monetary damages up to $15,000, small-claims matters seeking monetary damages up to $5,000, and landlord and tenant matters. The criminal jurisdiction of the court includes trials over misdemeanors, violations, and infractions, preliminary jurisdiction over felonies, and jurisdiction over traffic tickets charging a crime. In Suffolk County, the jurisdiction of the court also includes town ordinance offenses prosecuted by the towns.  This subject-matter jurisdiction is the same as the city courts within New York State.

Organization

The Nassau County District Court is organized into four districts, all of which sit at 99 Main Street, Hempstead, New York.  The First District covers criminal cases countywide.  The other three districts cover civil cases, and are organized by town and city: the Second covers Hempstead and Long Beach, the Third covers North Hempstead, and the Fourth covers Oyster Bay and Glen Cove.

The Suffolk County District Court is organized into six districts. The First district, having a "central location," covers criminal cases in all five towns.  The other five districts, having "outlying courthouses," are each coextensive with one of the towns, and have the above-noted jurisdiction over civil matters, small claims, landlord and tenant matters, and town ordinances.  The six districts are:

These districts do not correspond to districts of the New York Supreme Court.

Appeals
Appeals from the District Court go to the Appellate Term of the New York Supreme Court for the Second Department.

History
The Suffolk County District Court became active pursuant to the New York Uniform District Court Act in January 1964, replacing the town courts.

References

1964 establishments in New York (state)
Nassau County, New York
New York (state) state courts
Suffolk County, New York
Courts and tribunals established in 1964